The Leader of the Labour Party is the most senior politician within the Labour Party (PvdA) in the Netherlands.

The leaders outwardly act as the 'figurehead' and the main representative of the party. Within the party, they must ensure political consensus. At election time the leader is always the lijsttrekker (top candidate) of the party list. Outside election time the leader can serve as the Leader of the Opposition. In the Labour Party the party leader is often the parliamentary leader in the House of Representatives. Some leaders became a minister in the cabinet.

The position has been vacant since 12 April 2022, when Lilianne Ploumen resigned. Although the new parliamentary leader in the House of Representatives, Attje Kuiken, was elected on 22 April 2022, a party leader in the Netherlands is synonymous with the position of lijsttrekker, which will not be filled until before the next Dutch general election.

List

See also
Leadership elections
 2002
 2012
 2016

References

External links
  

 
 
Labour Party
Netherlands politics-related lists